Eugène Meyer was a French mechanic credited with making important contributions to the development of the bicycle. He received a French patent for wire wheels in 1868 and is now believed to be the person primarily responsible for making the penny-farthing feasible and widely known.

Biography
Meyer was born in Alsace and lived in Paris. He raced his own bicycles in order to promote them and placed 10th in the 1869 Paris-Rouen race. James Moore rode a Meyer high wheeler at the Midland Counties Championship in Wolverhampton in August 1870, and thereby introduced the design to England. Meyer died in Brunoy en Essonne at the age of 63.

References

External links 
Review of Bicycle Design: An Illustrated History with great image of "Eugène Meyer’s 1869 bicycle with tension spoking" "Courtesy of Keizo Kobayashi via MIT Press"

People from Alsace
19th-century French inventors
Cycle designers
Year of birth missing
Year of death missing